Blalock was an unincorporated community located in the Columbia River Gorge in Gilliam County, Oregon, United States. The town displaced a Native American settlement originally named Táwash. Blalock is still the name of a station on the Union Pacific Railroad (originally the Oregon Railway and Navigation Company, or OR&N).

History
The community was named for the farm of Dr. Nelson G. Blalock, a Civil War veteran who had pioneered in the Walla Walla area. He established an agricultural operation of several thousand acres on the flat land here along the Columbia River. The area was first settled in 1879, and Blalock post office was established in 1881. The town was platted in 1881 by the Blalock Wheat Growing Company. The first two buildings, a railroad station and a warehouse, were built by A. J. McLellan, OR&N superintendent of the construction of bridges and buildings. By 1884, the community was shipping wheat and there were daily stagecoaches to Heppner; the population was 50. People and businesses listed in the Polk Directory at that time included two clergymen, a saloon, a wagonmaker, a ferryman, a hotel, a general store, a lawyer, and a dealer in lumber, coal, and feed. In 1904, the town handled about 750,000 bushels of wheat. By 1905, the town had two grain warehouses, a hotel, a general store, a livery and stage stable, a real estate office and an agricultural implement factory. In 1940, Blalock had a population of 19. The post office closed in 1959. In 1968, the community was inundated by the backwaters from the John Day Dam.

See also
List of ghost towns in Oregon

References

External links
Historic image of the Blalock Diner from Salem Public Library
Historic image of a grain elevator in Blalock from University of Oregon digital archives
Images of Blalock from Flickr
Blalock Canyon from Lewis & Clark's Columbia River
Blalock, Nelson Gales from NCpedia

1881 establishments in Oregon
Populated places established in 1881
1968 disestablishments in Oregon
Former populated places in Oregon
Geography of Gilliam County, Oregon
Ghost towns in Oregon
Populated places disestablished in 1968